Convoy HX 90 was a North Atlantic convoy of the HX series which ran during the Battle of the Atlantic in World War II.

Background
HX 90 was an eastbound convoy of 41 ships which sailed from Halifax, Nova Scotia, Canada, on 21 November 1940 bound for Liverpool, England, and carrying war materials. The convoy, made up of contingents from Halifax, Sydney and Bermuda was led by convoy commodore V. P. Alleyne in Botavon.

The escort for the crossing had been sparse, as was common at this stage of the campaign, and the Western Approaches escort did not generally meet incoming convoys until south of Iceland, reckoned to be the limit of any patrolling U-boat's endurance. In HX 90's case the ocean escort was the Royal Navy armed merchant cruiser , and she was due to rendezvous with the Western Approaches escort on 2 December.

Also at sea were several other convoys; Convoy SC 13 was to the north of HX 90, also heading east, while heading towards them was the westbound Convoy OB 251. To the south, heading to the United Kingdom from Gibraltar, was Convoy HG 47.

Ranged against them was a pack of seven German submarines – U-boats – reinforced by three Italian submarines operating with them in the Atlantic Ocean. These were deployed in a patrol line at the fringe of the Western Approaches, hoping to intercept eastbound convoys before they met their escorts.

Action
On 1 December 1940, some 500 nautical miles (926 km) south of Iceland, HX 90 was sighted by U-101, which reported its position. Her skipper, Mengersen, was ordered to shadow and report. During the day, the first Western Approaches escort, the Royal Navy destroyer  under Lieutenant Commander M. S. Townsend, arrived from OB 251.

That evening, Mengersen was no longer able to resist attacking. He fired all twelve of his torpedoes, claiming four ships sunk and two damaged; in fact he sank three ships during the night – Apalachee, Kavak, and Lady Glanely – and damaged another, Loch Ranza.

Just after midnight on 2 December, U-47 joined, skippered by Gunther Prien; his attack sank one ship, Ville D'Arlon, which had become separated from the convoy, and damaged another, Conch. Prien attacked a third ship, Dunsley, with his deck gun, but was driven off by an escort ship.

Later U-95 joined, attacking the damaged Conch; Conch was again hit, but remained afloat. U-99, commanded by another ace, Otto Kretschmer, was en route to join the attack, but encountered the Royal Navy armed merchant cruiser  on her way to join OB 251 as ocean escort. Kretschmer attacked her, and hit Forfar five times with torpedoes; she sank with the loss of 172 of her crew, leaving 21 survivors.

On the morning of 2 December the pack was joined by U-52, which sank two ships, Tasso and Goodleigh. The convoy was joined by a further two escorts, the British sloop  and corvette , also from OB 251. They were assisted by the Royal Canadian Navy destroyer , which had been travelling with Forfar but had detached to reinforce HX 90's escort. Viscount and St. Laurent attacked numerous asdic contacts, making thirteen depth-charge attacks over four hours. No U-boats were hit, but all were kept submerged and silent, allowing HX 90 to escape.

Later that evening, however, the convoy was sighted again, by newcomer U-94; she attacked during the night of 2–3 December and sank two more ships, Stirlingshire and Wilhelmina.  Also that night, U-99 found and sank a straggler, Victoria City, (though other sources say she was sunk by U-140) and the damaged Conch, which she also sank.

No further U-boat attacks developed for HX 90, though on 3 December W Hendrik was bombed by German aircraft and sunk. The convoy met its local escort on 5 December and arrived in Liverpool later that day.

Conclusion
U-Boat Command (BdU), in the person of Rear Admiral Karl Dönitz, was delighted with the attack, believing his U-boats had sunk eighteen ships of over 120,000 GRT. In fact the confirmed loss to HX 90 was eleven ships of 73,495 GRT (other sources give 73,958 GRT). During the same period the pack had also sunk HMS Forfar, two ships from OB 251, and another from SC 13, and had damaged an escort from HG 47. None of the attacking U-boats had been sunk or damaged. However, 30 ships of HX 90 arrived safely, as did 41 ships of SC 13, the 30 ships of HG 47, and 31 ships of OB 251. Nevertheless, the attack on HX 90 was a setback for the Allies, and one of the more serious convoy losses of the Atlantic campaign.

Table

Notes

External links
   HX 90 at convoyweb
  HX 90 at uboatnet

References
Clay Blair : Hitler's U-Boat War Vol I (1996) 
Arnold Hague : The Allied Convoy System 1939–1945 (2000) . (Canada) . (UK)
Stephen Roskill : The War at Sea 1939–1945 Vol I (1954) ISBN (none)

HX090
Naval battles of World War II involving Canada
Naval battles of World War II involving the United Kingdom